Madeleine Brand  is an American broadcast journalist and radio personality. Brand is the host of the news and culture show Press Play, on KCRW-FM (89.9), one of Los Angeles' two National Public Radio (NPR) affiliates. The show made its debut in January 2014. Brand broadcasts from the basement of the cafeteria of Santa Monica College.

Education
A Los Angeles native, Brand grew up in the Hollywood Hills area of Los Angeles and the San Francisco Bay area.

Brand attended the University of California, Berkeley, beginning her radio career on college radio station KALX; she earned a B.A. in English, with honors, in 1988. She later received a master's degree from the Columbia University Graduate School of Journalism, where she later returned to teach documentary radio.

Career
Brand reported and anchored for NPR for thirteen years at various affiliates across the country: KQED, San Francisco; WBUR, Boston; WBGO, Newark, and WBFO, Buffalo. She served as West Coast correspondent and occasional substitute host for Morning Edition and All Things Considered. In 2006, she began co-hosting the radio program Day to Day with Alex Chadwick, which broadcast from NPR West studios in Los Angeles.

In 2010, Brand became host of the new daily Southern California Public Radio program The Madeleine Brand Show on the public radio station KPCC, which aired between 9 a.m. and 11 a.m. Pacific Time. The show broadcast from the Mohn Broadcast Center in Pasadena.  The show was popular for its first 23 months, and was the station's most-listened-to in-house program (with the highest Arbitron rankings), and won a number of radio journalism awards. However, the show came to an "abrupt end" after KPCC paired Brand with longtime ESPN sports reporter A Martínez in an attempt to attract Latino listeners and fulfill the requirements of a $6 million Corporation for Public Broadcasting grant. The pairing of the two hosts, under the name Brand & Martínez, debuted August 13, 2012, but lasted just four weeks and was a failure, in part because the two had met only twice before the program began. Brand left the station in September 2012 and was replaced by Alex Cohen (the show was renamed Take Two).

Following her time at NPR, Brand was briefly at the Los Angeles public television station KCET as a special contributor to the fifth season of SoCal Connected, hosted by Val Zavala.

In Summer 2013, Brand occasionally substituted for longtime broadcaster Warren Olney IV on his show To the Point on KPCC's rival KCRW. In September 2013, Brand moved to KCRW and began to develop Press Play, which debuted in January 2014, becoming the first new daily program on KCRW since 2001. Press Play competes against Larry Mantle's AirTalk on KPCC.

Personal life
Brand is married to filmmaker Joe DeMarie, and together they have two children. She lives in the Silver Lake neighborhood of Los Angeles.

References

External links
  KCRW.org: "Press Play with Madeleine Brand" — current LA news + culture broadcast—podcast. 
  NPR.org: KCRW's Press Play with Madeleine Brand — NPR podcasts links.  
  Twitter.com: Madeleine Brand (@TheMadBrand)
 Facebook.com: KCRW Press Play - Home
 LA Times.com: "Madeleine Brand returns to radio with 'Press Play' debut on KCRW" (January 2014) 
 Los Angeles Magazine.com: "Making Radio Waves: The Surprisingly Messy End to KPCC's The Madeleine Brand Show" (November 2013)
  NPR.org: "Madeleine Brand Joins Alex Chadwick as Host of Day to Day, the NPR Midday Newsmagazine." (February 2006)  
 Notebook on Cities and Culture.org: An interview with Madeleine Brand

American radio journalists
American television journalists
Radio personalities from Los Angeles
Year of birth missing (living people)
Living people
Journalists from California
NPR personalities
Columbia University Graduate School of Journalism alumni
UC Berkeley College of Letters and Science alumni
People from Silver Lake, Los Angeles
21st-century American women writers
21st-century American journalists
American women television journalists
American women radio journalists